The Northeast Generals are a Tier II junior ice hockey team based in Attleboro, Massachusetts. The team competes in the North American Hockey League (NAHL).

History
In 2015, the organization added a Tier III junior team to the North American 3 Eastern Hockey League (NA3EHL). The team finished last in the East Division with a 9–32–3 record. In 2016, the NA3EHL was merged into the North American 3 Hockey League (NA3HL) and the Tier III Generals followed.

On April 1, 2016, the Generals were also approved for a Tier II junior team in the NA3HL's overseeing organization, the North American Hockey League (NAHL). The Generals became the easternmost team in the NAHL. Continuing his position from the Tier III team, their first head coach and general manager was Bryan Erikson. After 29 straight losses to start the season, Erikson stepped down as coach and hired Joe Lovell as his replacement. The Generals won their first game in their second game under Lovell on January 7, 2017, over the Wilkes-Barre/Scranton Knights. They would go on to finish the season with 4–53–3–0 record and last in the league. The Generals made the Robertson Cup playoffs in the following season, but lost in the semifinals to the Philadelphia Rebels. In their third season, they made it to the Robertson Cup playoffs, but lost in the first round to the Johnstown Tomahawks.

In 2019, Joe Lovell left the team and launched the New England Knights in the North American 3 Hockey League, while Erikson took over as head coach of the Generals again.

Season-by-season records

References

External links
NAHL Northeast Generals
NAHL website

2016 establishments in Massachusetts
Attleboro, Massachusetts
Ice hockey clubs established in 2016
Ice hockey teams in Massachusetts
North American Hockey League teams
Sports in Bristol County, Massachusetts